Montague was an American Thoroughbred racehorse. He won the 1890 Preakness Stakes.

References

Thoroughbred family 12-b
Racehorses bred in the United States
Racehorses trained in the United States
Preakness Stakes winners
1885 racehorse births
Byerley Turk sire line